John Hollis Bankhead (September 13, 1842March 1, 1920) was a Democratic U.S. Senator from the state of Alabama between 1907 and 1920.

Life and career
Bankhead was born on September 13, 1842, at Moscow, present-day Lamar County, Alabama (near present-day Sulligent), the son of Susan Fleming (Hollis) and James Greer Bankhead. His great-grandfather, James Bankhead (1738–1799) was born in Ulster and settled in South Carolina.

He was educated in the common schools and served in the Confederate States Army, during the Civil War, rising to the rank of captain, in the Alabama 16th Infantry, Company K. He married Tallulah James Brockman. She was of Revolutionary ancestry, her father's great-grandfather, Benjamin Kilgore, having been a captain of a South Carolina company in the War of the Revolution. She was the daughter of James H. Brockman, a native of Greenville District, South Carolina. Her education was received in the fashionable schools of Tuskegee and Montgomery, Alabama. Their two elder sons, John Hollis and William Brockman, were practicing lawyers. The youngest, Henry McAuley, was a student at the University of Alabama. The elder daughter, Louise, married Representative William Hayne Perry, of Greenville, South Carolina, son of former South Carolina governor Benjamin Franklin Perry and the younger, Marie, was the wife of Thomas McAdory Owen, a historian by profession.

Bankhead was a member of the Alabama House of Representatives from 1865 to 1867, and again in 1880 and 1881. In 1876 and 1877 he was a member of the State Senate. He was elected to the United States House of Representatives in 1887, serving until 1907. At age 65, John H. Bankhead was appointed, then elected, to serve out the remainder of the U.S. Senate term left by the death of John Tyler Morgan and later re-elected twice. He served from June 18, 1907, until his death in Washington on March 1, 1920. B. B. Comer, former governor of Alabama, was appointed to serve the rest of his term, until November 2, 1920, when J. Thomas Heflin was elected to serve out the term.

Bankhead was a member of the Inland Waterways Commission in 1907, and was instrumental in enacting the Federal Aid Road Act of 1916, which became the first federal highway funding legislation.
He was also a member of the Commission on Public Buildings and the Commission on Rivers and Harbors. He wrote several books relating to post roads.

United States Senator John H. Bankhead II and Speaker of the House William Brockman Bankhead were his sons, and actress Tallulah Bankhead was his granddaughter. The cross-country Bankhead Highway was named after him, as is Bankhead Lake on the Black Warrior River near Birmingham. Also, the Bankhead Tunnel on US 98 in Mobile, Alabama, is named after him.

See also
Bankhead House (Jasper, Alabama)
James Greer Bankhead House
List of United States Congress members who died in office (1900–49)

References

External links

 John H. Bankhead, late a representative from Alabama, Memorial addresses delivered in the House of Representatives and Senate frontispiece 1917

1842 births
1920 deaths
People from Marengo County, Alabama
Bankhead family
American people of Scotch-Irish descent
Democratic Party members of the United States House of Representatives from Alabama
Democratic Party United States senators from Alabama
Democratic Party Alabama state senators
Democratic Party members of the Alabama House of Representatives
Confederate States Army officers
People of Alabama in the American Civil War
People from Sulligent, Alabama
People from Marion County, Alabama